DZYB (102.3 FM) is a radio station owned by Nation Broadcasting Corporation and operated by TV5 Network, Inc., serving as a relay station of Radyo5 in Manila. The station's transmitter is located at Mt. Sto. Tomas, Tuba, Benguet.

History
The station began operations in 1978 as MRS 102.3, airing an adult contemporary format. In 1998, after NBC was acquired by PLDT subsidiary MediaQuest Holdings, the station rebranded as Jesse @ Rhythms 102.3 and switched to a Top 40 format. In 2005, the name was shortened to 102.3 Jesse as the station switched to an urban contemporary format. On February 21, 2011, months after TV5 took over operations of the stations, it became a relay station of Radyo5 92.3 in Manila.

References

Radio stations in Baguio
News and talk radio stations in the Philippines
Radio stations established in 1978